The 2019–20 Iowa Hawkeyes women's basketball team represents the University of Iowa during the 2019–20 NCAA Division I women's basketball season. The Hawkeyes, led by 20th year head coach Lisa Bluder, play their home games at Carver–Hawkeye Arena in Iowa City, IA as members of the Big Ten Conference.

Roster

Schedule and results

|-
!colspan=9 style=| Exhibition

|-
!colspan=9 style=| Non-conference regular season

|-
!colspan=9 style=| Big Ten conference season

|-
!colspan=9 style=| Big Ten Women's Tournament

Rankings

See also
2019–20 Iowa Hawkeyes men's basketball team

References

Iowa Hawkeyes women's basketball seasons
Iowa
Iowa Hawkeyes
Iowa Hawkeyes